Lyuboslav Hristov Voynov (Bulgarian:Любослав Войнов; born 2 October 1992) is a Bulgarian  football player who plays as a midfielder, currently playing for  Pirin Blagoevgrad. Voynov began his youth career in FC Pirin 2001 (Blagoevgrad) . At the age of 17 he joined PSFC Chernomorets Burgas.He made his professional debut at the age of 18 by playing for Chernomoretz (Pomorie) in Bulgarian B Professional Football Group. From seasons 2012/2014 he played for Bansko.From season 2014/2015 he joined Pirin Blagoevgrad.

References 
 http://www.footballdatabase.eu/football.joueurs.lyuboslav.voynov.146068.en.html

1992 births
Living people
Bulgarian footballers
Association football midfielders
Sportspeople from Blagoevgrad
FC Bansko players
Second Professional Football League (Bulgaria) players